The Wadhwa Group is a real estate development and construction company established in 1969 and located in Mumbai, India.

The group is one of Mumbai's leading real estate companies and is currently developing residential, commercial and township projects spread across approximately 1.4 million square meters (15 million square feet). 

Over the years, The Wadhwa Group has received many awards for both its commercial as well as residential properties. Among them are accolades at the 'Asia Pacific Property Awards 2013-2014' and the 'International Property Awards Asia Pacific.'

References

Real estate companies of India
Real estate companies established in 1969
Construction and civil engineering companies established in 1969
1969 establishments in Maharashtra
Real estate companies based in Mumbai
Indian companies established in 1969